Kevin Manzano Cortés (born 25 February 1999) is a Spanish professional footballer who plays as a right winger for Las Rozas CF.

Club career
A CD San Fernando de Henares youth graduate, Madrid-born Manzano made his first-team debut for the club on 12 October 2017, playing the last 14 minutes and scoring the equalizer in a 1–1 Tercera División home draw against AD Alcorcón B. He went on to feature regularly during the campaign, scoring eight goals in 22 appearances as his side finished in an impressive sixth position.

On 6 August 2018, Manzano moved to Getafe CF and was assigned to the reserves also in the fourth division. The following 19 July, he joined another reserve team, Atlético Albacete in the same category, but left the club on 14 November 2019 and subsequently returned to his first side San Fernando.

On 30 September 2020, Manzano signed for Rayo Vallecano's B-team, still in division four. He left on 29 July of the following year and joined CF Fuenlabrada, spending the pre-season with the main squad but being initially assigned to the reserves in Tercera División RFEF.

Manzano made his first-team debut for Fuenla on 14 December 2021, starting in a 0–0 away draw (5–4 penalty win) against UD San Sebastián de los Reyes, in the season's Copa del Rey. He made his professional debut on 2 January 2022, coming on as a late substitute for Álex Mula in a 1–2 home loss against UD Ibiza in the Segunda División.

References

External links

1999 births
Living people
Footballers from Madrid
Spanish footballers
Association football wingers
Segunda División players
Tercera División players
Tercera Federación players
CD San Fernando de Henares players
Getafe CF B players
Atlético Albacete players
CF Fuenlabrada B players
CF Fuenlabrada footballers
Las Rozas CF players